The 2015 World RX of Germany was the fifth round of the second season of the FIA World Rallycross Championship. The event was held at the Estering in Buxtehude, Lower Saxony.

It was the first event win for Frenchman Davy Jeanney.

Heats

Semi-finals

World Championship

Semi-final 1

Semi-final 2

European Championship

Semi-final 1

Semi-final 2

Finals

World Championship

European Championship

Standings after the event

World Championship standings

European Championship standings

 Note: Only the top five positions are included for both sets of standings.

References

External links

|- style="text-align:center"
|width="35%"|Previous race:2015 World RX of Great Britain
|width="30%"|FIA World Rallycross Championship2015 season
|width="35%"|Next race:2015 World RX of Sweden
|- style="text-align:center"
|width="35%"|Previous race:2014 World RX of Germany
|width="30%"|World RX of Germany
|width="35%"|Next race:2016 World RX of Germany
|- style="text-align:center"

Germany
World RX, Germany